= Grace Community School =

Location
- 715 West William Street; Delaware, Ohio 43015; United States
- Coordinates: 40.299972°N 83.091505°W

Information
- Type: Private Christian Elementary
- Motto: "An education that starts with the heart!"
- Established: 2006
- Principal: Mr. Phil Mears
- Faculty: 9
- Grades: Preschool - 7th
- Enrollment: 103
- Campus: Suburban
- Colors: red, white & black
- Website: StartWithTheHeartSchool.com

Grace Community School is an inter-denominational Christian school in Delaware, Ohio and offers Kindergarten-twelfth grades.

== Mission ==
The school's mission is "to assist Christian families in their biblical responsibility to train their children to become Christ-like and to fulfill God's purpose for these children in their home, their church, and society."

== History ==
Established in 2006, Grace Community School is directed by a parent-based school board. Parental involvement is strongly encouraged through PTF meetings and regular school "family" functions.
